John J. Paris, S.J. is the current Michael P. Walsh Professor of Bioethics at Boston College.

Biography
He received a B.S in history  from Boston College in 1959, an A.M. in Government and Education  from  Harvard University in 1969, a Ph.L. in Philosophy from  Weston College in 1967, and  a B.D. in Theology from Boston College in 1967. He then received both an M. A. and a  Ph.D.  (1972) in   Social Ethics from the  University of Southern California. His doctoral thesis was "Toward an understanding of the Supreme Court's approach to religion in conscientious objector cases"
Before coming to the Boston College faculty, he  held the position of Professor of Religious Studies at the College of the Holy Cross, Worcester, MA  from 1972-1990. While teaching at Holy Cross and then Boston college he held the position of Adjunct Professor of Medicine at the  University of Massachusetts Medical School from 1982-1994, and Clinical Professor of Family Medicine and Community Health at Tufts University School of Medicine  (1985-1998).

Professional career
His academic background extends to  history, government, education, and philosophy. With over 150 publications in the areas of law, medicine, and ethics, Paris has made an extensive impact in the field of medical ethics. He has participated in over 80 court hearings including the  notable Brophy vs New England Sinai Hospital, which commented on the right of patients in a persistent vegetative state to refuse medical care.  Additionally, he has been consulted by over 500 organizations to comment on the ethics of medical treatments, procedures, and practices.

References

Year of birth missing (living people)
Living people
Harvard University alumni
Boston College alumni
Boston College faculty
University of Southern California alumni